Valeri Arutyunov is a former Soviet Armenian Greco-Roman wrestler. He won a silver medal at the 1974 World Wrestling Championships and two silver and one bronze medal at the European Wrestling Championships at 52 kg.

References

Living people
Armenian wrestlers
Soviet male sport wrestlers
World Wrestling Championships medalists
Year of birth missing (living people)
European Wrestling Championships medalists